Francisco Javier Errázuriz Talavera (born Santiago May 7, 1942) is a Chilean businessman and a former senator and presidential candidate of the Progressive Union of the Centrist Center. He is commonly known as Fra-Fra because he was a stutterer during his childhood. Errázuriz Talavera is of Basque descent.

Life
He was born in Santiago, son of former senator Ladislao Errázuriz and Amelia Talavera. He studied in the Liceo Alemán and the Escuela Militar Bernardo O'Higgins, reaching the rank of "brigadier major".

On 1989, Errázuriz decided to create the Progressive Union of the Centrist Center and become a candidate in the presidential elections that year. He won 15% of the vote, but managed only to take votes from right-wing candidate Hernán Büchi.

On 1993, Errázuriz was elected Senator for the 10th Congressional District, North Maule, for the period 1994 to 2002. From 1998 to 2000, Errázuriz presided over the Economic Commission.

Legal problems
However, the Rancagua Appeals Court accused Errázuriz of "crimes and kidnapping" on December 22, 1998, due to the accusations by attorney Francisco Fernández, who said he had been attacked and retained against his will by workers of Errázuriz in his property in Maule. The Supreme Court voted to strip Errázuriz of his senatorial immunity on 1999, the first time a senator lost his immunity since 1967.

Errázuriz then tried to sue Fernández for libel, but the Rancagua Appeals Court rejected the case. Errázuriz then lodged a complaint against the court. The Supreme Court rejected Errázuriz claims, too, and acquitted Fernández. This was not the end of Errázuriz' legal troubles however.

Errázuriz had been having a legal fight over property against Marcos Jaramillo for a long time, and by 1998 there were several lawsuits between Errázuriz and Jaramillo. Errázuriz decided to take matters into his own hands and threatened Jaramillo with a shotgun when Jaramillo entered what Errázuriz considered his property. Jaramillo then accused Errázuriz of armed trespass and death threats against him and his family. In response, Errázuriz donated his property to the municipality of Pichilemu to make it into a "resort for the people". The court decided against Jaramillo, who was sentenced to prison for 61 days for libel against Errázuriz.

Three of Errázuriz's companies then went bankrupt and investigations were carried out against another of his companies, Inverraz (Inversiones Errázuriz).

Election

Chilean parliamentary election, 1993 
Senator election 1993 circumscription 10 (Maule Region: Curicó-Talca).

References

Additional sources 
Official congressional biography 
Genealogical chart of Errázuriz family

External links
Human Rights Watch on the Fernández/Jaramillo cases

1942 births
F
Living people
Members of the Senate of Chile
Candidates for President of Chile
Chilean people of Basque descent
People from Santiago
Union of the Centrist Center politicians
Chilean agronomists
Pontifical Catholic University of Chile alumni